Prasophyllum abblittiorum is a species of orchid endemic to Tasmania. It has a single tubular, green leaf and up to twelve yellowish green flowers with faint streaks. It is an unusual prasophyllum in that the labellum is not ornamented. Only about 100 plants are known, growing at two sites in the Arthur-Pieman Conservation Area.

Description
Unlike those of most other prasophyllums, the labellum is not ornamented and resembles the petals. Flowering occurs from mid-October to early November.

Taxonomy and naming
Prasophyllum abblittiorum was first formally described in 2017 by Philip A. Collier from a specimen collected in the Arthur-Pieman Conservation Area and the description was published in Muelleria. The specific epithet (abblittiorum) honours the Abblitt family, two of whom discovered this species.

Distribution and habitat
This leek orchid is only known from two sites in the Arthur-Pieman Conservation Area. It grows in wet heath and on the side of a road.

Conservation
Prasophyllum abblittiorum satisfies the conditions for listing as "endangered" under the Tasmanian Threatened Species Protection Act 1995 because of its small population size and the presence of a population on a roadside. About 25 individuals have been observed on the roadside and about 85 in the "bush".

References

External links 
 

abblittiorum
Flora of Tasmania
Endemic orchids of Australia
Plants described in 2017